Sir Daniel O'Brien, 1st Viscount Clare also called Donal ( – 1666) was an Irish politician and soldier. He was born a younger son of Connor O'Brien, 3rd Earl of Thomond. He fought against the insurgents at Tyrone's Rebellion, but for the insurgents in the Irish Rebellion of 1641 and the Irish Confederate Wars. He resisted the Cromwellian conquest of Ireland. He joined Charles II of England in exile and was in his eighties made a viscount at the Restoration.

Birth and origins 

Daniel or Donal was born about 1577, the third and youngest son of Connor O'Brien and his second wife, Una O'Brien. or in 1666 and was succeeded by his eldest surviving son, Connor. His father was the 3rd Earl of Thomond.

His mother was a daughter of Turlough Mac-i-Brien-Ara. His parents were from different branches of the O'Briens, an important Gaelic Irish dynasty that descended from Brian Boru, medieval high king of Ireland. His father was from the branch of the Earls of Thomond. His mother was from the branch of the O'Briens of Ara in County Tipperary. She was a sister of Murtogh O'Brien-Arra, Anglican bishop of Killaloe. 

Daniel was one of at least seven siblings, who are listed in his father's article. His eldest brother, Donogh, would become the 4th Earl of Thomond.

Early life 
Whereas Donough, the eldest brother and heir apparent to the earldom of Thomond, was educated as a Protestant in England, the younger brothers Teige and Daniel were educated as Catholics. The father died in 1581 and was succeeded by Daniel's eldest brother as the 4th Earl of Thomond. His mother died in 1589 at Clare Castle.

Nine Years' War 
In 1598 during Tyrone's Rebellion, also known as the Nine years' War in Ireland, the insurgents led by Hugh O'Neill, Earl of Tyrone and his ally Hugh Roe O'Donnell marched south to relieve the siege of Kinsale. O'Donnell invaded Clare, ravaging the country and capturing most of the castles. O'Brien had been left by his brother Donough O'Brien, 4th Earl of Thomond, absent in England, to defend his lands. In February 1599 O'Brien was attacked in his castle of Ibrickane, wounded, and taken prisoner by O'Donnell.

Marriage and children 
In 1600 O'Brien married Catherine FitzGerald, widow of Maurice Roche, 6th Viscount Fermoy, and the third daughter of Gerald FitzGerald, 14th Earl of Desmond, the rebel earl, and his second wife, Eleanor Butler.

 
Daniel and Catherine had four sons:
 Donogh (died 1638), married Elizabeth Dowdall but died predeceasing his father.
 Connor (1605–1670), succeeded as 2nd Viscount Clare
Morrough, died childless
 Teige

—and seven daughters of which nothing seems to be known.

Knight and Parliaments 
On 1 July 1604 in Leixlip, County Kildare, O'Brien was knighted and became Sir Daniel O'Brien. He was elected as one of the two "knights of the shire", as county MPs were then called, for Clare County in the Irish House of Commons 1613 to 1614. At the election of the speaker O'Brien supported the Catholic candidate John Everard.

In the Irish Parliament of 1634–1635 he replaced his nephew Barnabas O'Brien, the future 6th Earl of Thomond, who had absented himself to England.

Irish Rebellion and Confederate Wars 
O'Brien was a member of the Supreme Council of the Catholic Confederates. In 1649 he fought the Cromwellians in Clare. He surrendered Clare Castle on 5 November and Carrigaholt Castle on 9 November.

On June 1652, at Ross Castle near Killarney, O'Brien together with Lord Muskerry surrendered to Ludlow. O'Brien served as a hostage to guarantee Muskerry's compliance with the terms.

Restoration, Viscount Clare, and death 
At the Restoration O'Brien returned to Ireeland. On 11 July 1662 Charles II created him Baron Moyarta and Viscount Clare. The honour was intended for his grandson Daniel, into who's hands the estate was directly conveyed. Lord Clare, as he now was, attended the House of Lords during the Irish Parliament 1661–1666. He died in 1663 or in 1666 and was succeeded by his eldest surviving son, Connor.

Notes and references

Notes

Citations

Sources 
 
 
  – (for Thomond)
 
  – N to R (for Ormond)
  – S to T (for Thomond)
  – Canonteign to Cutts (for Clare)
 
 
  – 1625 to 1655
  – (for timeline)
 
  – 1534–1691
 
  – Earls (under Inchiquin)
 
 
  – Irish stem
 
 
 
 
  – 1641 to 1643

1577 births
1663 deaths
16th-century Irish people
17th-century Irish people
Irish MPs 1613–1615
Members of the Parliament of Ireland (pre-1801) for County Clare constituencies
Daniel
Peers of Ireland created by Charles II
Politicians from County Clare
Viscounts in the Peerage of Ireland
Younger sons of earls